The Legend of Sarila is a 2013 Canadian computer-animated adventure film and Canada's first 3-D animated feature film. The film draws heavily on Inuit culture and tradition. Set in northern Canada in 1910, it tells the story of three young Inuit, who set out for the legendary land of Sarila in search of food for their clan. One of them, Markussi, finds out during their adventures that he is really an Inuit shaman, while the clan's shaman at home repeatedly attempts to kill him and undermine their quest.

The film was picked up for distribution in the United States by Phase 4 Films, under the title Frozen Land (not to be confused with the Finnish movie Frozen Land) and with an adapted logo in order to mimic Disney's Frozen, which resulted in a lawsuit with Disney.

Plot 

The young orphan Markussi lives with his little sister Mipoulok in an Inuit clan. Markussi can talk to animals and has some special powers unique to shamans. He does not want to be a shaman though and mainly keeps his powers a secret because he fears being a shaman would make him like the clan's shaman Croolik. Croolik grew selfish and unjust after the deaths of his sons, who died along with Markussi's father in an accident on a hunting trip. Croolik blames his sons' deaths on his now-separated wife Saya (who he accuses of having let their sons go hunting at too young an age) and Markussi's father. By extension, Croolik also hates Markussi.

At the beginning of the film, Croolik secretly turns away from the goddess Sedna and tries to call on the spirit of darkness. In punishment, Sedna takes all animals away from the clan's lands, provoking a dangerous food shortage and lack of tradable pelts.

Desperate, the clan decides to search for Sarila, a legendary land where animals are said to be plenty. Under Croolik's influence—who intends Markussi to die on the quest—three young Inuit are selected: Markussi, along with his two friends, Putulik (son of the clan chief), and Apik, who were promised to each other when they were children. Saya, who now lives on her own as a healer, offers to take care of Markussi's young sister and her dog Kajuk in his absence.

The three friends leave the clan with sled dogs and Apik's pet lemming Kimi. On their quest, they face several dangers, repeatedly brought on by Croolik through magic; this includes possessing Putulik by means of twin amulets (called "medallions"), so that Putulik attacks Markussi. The three young travellers can overcome all dangers, repeatedly saved by Markussi's powers. In the meantime, Croolik frames his former wife Saya for stealing food from the clan and has her banned from the clan.

Eventually the three friends reach Sarila, a warm place full of life, where they can quickly hunt the much-needed food for the clan. Besides, Apik realizes she loves Markussi, who had already shown affection for her before. Markussi is told by Sedna that he has passed all tests, but needs to do one "small thing" for her upon return to the clan, for the animals to be released; when asking what she requires, she only responds that "a true shaman knows what to do" and to "do what you must." Briefly afterwards, Putulik is again possessed by Croolik and tries to kill Markussi, but the lemming Kimi realizes the role of Putulik's amulet and rips it off, freeing Putulik.

Upon return to the clan, Apik tells that she wants to marry Markussi, and her parents consent. Putulik had already agreed earlier. He now wishes to travel and learn more about others' ways before becoming the clan's chief one day.

Croolik is enraged that Markussi is still alive and challenges him. Markussi accepts the magical fight, understanding that this is Sedna's last wish and thereby proving himself a true shaman. Croolik is defeated and, dying, confesses that he framed Saya and asks for her forgiveness.

On behalf of the clan, Markussi formally asks Sedna for forgiveness, and she lets the animals return. Croolik's crow offers his services to Markussi. When he declines, the crow flies away; in the last shot it is seen carrying one of the twin amulets, which lights up in the same way as it did when Putulik was possessed.

Voice cast
 Dustin Milligan as Markussi, an orphan with Shamanic powers
 Rachelle Lefevre as Apik, promised to Putulik when she was a small girl
 Tim Rozon as Putulik, the son of chief Itak; promised to Apik when he was a small boy
 Christopher Plummer as shaman Croolik
 Geneviève Bujold as healer and Croolik's former wife Saya
 Tyrone Benskin as chief Itak and Dawn Ford as his wife Tayara, who is too sick to do anything but moan
 Sonja Ball as Kimi, Apik's lemming
 James Kidnie as Kwatak, Croolik's crow
 Angela Galuppo as Mipoulok, Markussi's sister
 Elias Toufexis as Kauji and Holly O'Brien as Jiniak, Apik's parents
 Robert Higden as the tall hunter Arlok 
 Natar Ungalaaq as Markussi's "guardian spirit" Ukpik (the Inuinnaqtun word for snowy owl)
 Elisapie Isaac as the goddess Sedna
 Harry Standjofski as Uliak, another hunter of the clan
 Kajuk, Mipoulik's dog

Production
The $8.5 million production was promoted as Canada's first 3D animated feature film.

International distribution
The international distribution rights are being licensed by Cinema Management Group.

Reception 
On the website Rotten Tomatoes, the film counted two favourable and one unfavourable review, too few to compute an average rating. Similarly, the site Metacritic includes a single favourable review (score of 70).

The National Post noted "The film is enjoyable enough, though the plot is as thin as spring ice." The Hollywood Reporter praised "the wonderful voice performances by the ever-reliable Bujold and Plummer", but criticized that the "[n]arratively muddled and visually undistinguished" "film hyperactively lurches from one frenzied action sequence to the next, insuring that young viewers' attention spans won't be too sorely tested. But the one-note characterizations and predictable animation tropes quickly prove wearisome, and despite the exoticism of its setting The Legend of Sarila ultimately fails to enchant."

Awards
Elisapie Isaac and composer Olivier Auriol received a Canadian Screen Award nomination for Best Original Song at the 2nd Canadian Screen Awards in 2014, for the song "Far Away".

Trademark infringement lawsuit in the United States 

In late December 2013, The Walt Disney Company filed a trademark infringement lawsuit against Phase 4 Films, the distributor of this film in the United States, which retitled the film as Frozen Land and used a logo that mimicked the one made for Disney's Frozen, which was heavily marketed at the time and to be released in less than three weeks. By late January 2014, the two companies had settled the case; the settlement stated that the distribution and promotion of The Legend of Sarila and related merchandise must use its original title and Phase 4 must not use trademarks, logos or other designs confusingly similar to Disney's animated release. Phase 4 was also required to pay Disney $100,000 before 27 January 2014, and make "all practicable efforts" to remove copies of Frozen Land from stores and online distributors before 3 March 2014.

References

External links
 
 
 

2010s adventure films
2013 films
2013 computer-animated films
2013 3D films
3D animated films
Films about Inuit in Canada
Canadian adventure films
English-language Canadian films
2013 animated films
Canadian animated feature films
Works subject to a lawsuit
Films involved in plagiarism controversies
Film controversies
Disney controversies
2010s English-language films
2010s Canadian films